Dzhigiya (Kaitag and Dargwa: Жигай) is a rural locality (a selo) in Shilyaginsky Selsoviet, Kaytagsky District, Republic of Dagestan, Russia. The population was 286 as of 2010. There are 13 streets.

Geography 
Dzhigiya is located 8 km southwest of Madzhalis (the district's administrative centre) by road. Shilyagi and Kulidzha are the nearest rural localities.

Nationalities 
Dargins live there.

References 

Rural localities in Kaytagsky District